Aceria malherbae is a species of gall mite known as the bindweed gall mite. It is used as an agent of biological pest control on invasive species of bindweed, particularly field bindweed (Convolvulus arvensis).

This mite is native to central and southern Europe and northern Africa. It was imported from Greece and released in the US state of Texas in 1989. It is now established in Texas and surrounding states, where it has been known to reduce the density of invasive field bindweed. The adult mite is nearly microscopic and looks like a minute yellow maggot with two pairs of legs. The nymph is similar in appearance to the adult. The adult and the nymph both damage the plant, feeding on the leaves during the warmer seasons when the plant is growing, and on stem and root buds when the plant is dormant over the winter. Galls form on damaged plant tissues, causing leaves to warp and curl and stems and roots to grow out stunted if at all.

References 

 Coombs, E. M., et al., (2004). Biological Control of Invasive Plants in the United States. Corvallis: Oregon State University Press, 153.

External links 
 Lauriault, L. M., et al. Managing Aceria malherbae gall mites for control of field bindweed. New Mexico State Cooperative Extension

Eriophyidae

Animals described in 1985
Arachnids of Africa
Arachnids of Europe
Arachnids of North America
Galls
Invasive plants biological control agents